Jonathan Edward Page (born 8 February 1990) is an English professional footballer who plays as a defender for East Fife.

Career
Having started his career in the youth sides at Southampton and then Portsmouth, Page signed for Motherwell in 2008. He made his debut for Motherwell in a Europa League first qualifying round match against Llanelli on 9 July 2009. He also featured in the next round, against Flamurtari.

In February 2009, Page signed on loan for Stirling Albion until the end of the 2009–10 season. He scored his first senior goals scoring twice against East Fife in a 3–0 win for Stirling. The loan was to prove beneficial, as Page helped The Binos to the Second Division title, earning promotion to the First Division.

On his return to Motherwell, Page signed a one-year contract extension, until 2012. He scored his first goal for Motherwell in a Europa League third qualifying round second-leg match against Aalesunds of Norway, the third goal for The Steelmen in a 3–0 win. He then followed that up with a double in a 2–0 win over Brechin City in the League Cup on 21 September 2010.

On 27 September 2012, with first-team opportunities limited, Page went on a one-month loan to Lanarkshire derby rivals Hamilton Academical.
 That was later extended by a further month, and extended further until 27 December 2012.

On 31 December 2012, Motherwell announced that Page would be released from his contract six-months early, making him free to sign for another club. Two days later, Page signed a permanent deal with Hamilton Academical until the end of the season.

On 18 June 2013, Page signed for Morton. On 23 January 2014, he left Morton by mutual consent.

After leaving Morton, Page signed for Scottish League One club Dunfermline Athletic on 24 January 2014. He made his debut for Dunfermline in the 3–1 victory over Fife rivals East Fife on 1 February 2014

On 11 September 2014, Page signed for Scottish League Two club East Fife on a three-month loan. After the loan ended in December, Page returned to Dunfermline and featured in the loss against Airdrieonians. The following month he returned on loan to Bayview Stadium for the remainder of the season. After just one season with The Pars, Page was released by the club.

After leaving Dunfermline, Page signed a permanent deal with East Fife.

Page spent three seasons with the Methil side before joining Airdrieonians in June 2018. At the end of the 2018–19 season, he was made available for transfer by Airdrieonians.

After spending time training with Peterhead, Page signed for Brechin City on 13 August 2019. 

Page then moved to Clyde in June 2021. On 3 May 2022, Page was one of ten players released by the club at the end of the 2021–22 season.

Career statistics

Honours

Club
Stirling Albion
Scottish Second Division: 2009–10

East Fife
Scottish League Two: 2015–16

Individual
Scottish League One Player of the Month: December 2016
PFA Scotland Scottish League Two Team of the Year: 2015–16
PFA Scotland Scottish League One Team of the Year: 2016–17

References

External links

1990 births
Living people
Footballers from Portsmouth
Association football defenders
English footballers
Southampton F.C. players
Portsmouth F.C. players
Motherwell F.C. players
Stirling Albion F.C. players
Scottish Football League players
Hamilton Academical F.C. players
Greenock Morton F.C. players
Dunfermline Athletic F.C. players
East Fife F.C. players
Airdrieonians F.C. players
Brechin City F.C. players
Scottish Premier League players
Scottish Professional Football League players
Clyde F.C. players
East Kilbride F.C. players
Lowland Football League players